Harry Arthur Wade (March 12, 1928 – July 10, 2016) was a Canadian basketball player, from Windsor, Ontario, who competed in the 1952 Summer Olympics.

He was part of the Canadian basketball team, which was eliminated after the group stage in the 1952 tournament. He played all six matches.

Wade was on the University of Western Ontario Mustangs basketball team.

Wade died on July 10, 2016. He was 88.

References

External links
profile
death notice

1928 births
2016 deaths
Basketball players from Windsor, Ontario
Basketball players at the 1952 Summer Olympics
Canadian men's basketball players
Olympic basketball players of Canada
Western Mustangs basketball players